is a Japanese volleyball player. She plays for the Japan women's national volleyball team. She competed at the 2020 Summer Olympics, in Women's volleyball.

Early life 
Momii was born in Sagamihara, Kanagawa Prefecture. Her father is Peruvian-Spanish, while her mother is Peruvian-Japanese. Momii is a Peruvian citizen until high school. 

When she was in elementary school, there was a volleyball team near her house, then she started playing volleyball when she was invited by a friend. Momii joined JT Marvelous after graduating from Hachioji Middle School in February 2019. 

In 2021, she was selected to the Japanese national team for the first time in the Olympics.

References 

2000 births
Living people
Japanese women's volleyball players
Volleyball players at the 2020 Summer Olympics
Olympic volleyball players of Japan